Tragia balfourii is a species of plant in the family Euphorbiaceae. It is endemic to Yemen. Its natural habitat is subtropical or tropical dry forests.

References

balfourii
Endemic flora of Socotra
Least concern plants
Taxonomy articles created by Polbot